Drop Dead Diva is an American legal comedy-drama/fantasy television series that aired on Lifetime from July 12, 2009, to June 22, 2014. The series was created by Josh Berman and produced by Sony Pictures Television. It stars Brooke Elliott as Jane, a plus-sized lawyer whose body is inhabited by the soul of a fashion model.

On October 25, 2013, Lifetime renewed the series for a sixth season, which premiered on March 23, 2014, and concluded on June 22, 2014.

Plot
The series revolves around vapid aspiring model Deborah "Deb" Dobkins (played by Brooke D'Orsay), who is killed in a car crash on the way to an audition for The Price Is Right. As her soul enters the gates of Heaven, she finds herself being judged by a gatekeeper named Fred (Ben Feldman). As a result of her shallowness, Fred declares her a "zero-zero", since she has performed zero good deeds and zero bad deeds during her time on Earth. While he is distracted, Deb presses the "return" key before Fred can stop her, and is brought back to life in the body of a recently deceased lawyer named Jane Bingum (Elliott), who died protecting her boss, Jay Parker (Josh Stamberg).

Jane is the complete opposite of Deb; she is brilliant, hard-working, charitable, and plus-sized. Deb finds that Jane also works in the same law firm, Harrison-Parker, as Deb's fiancé Grayson Kent (Jackson Hurst). After immediately telling her best friend, Stacy Barrett (April Bowlby), of her predicament, Deb prepares herself to tell Grayson the truth about her new body. However, Fred's assignment as Deb's guardian angel serves as punishment for letting her leave heaven. His purpose on Earth is to prevent Deb from telling Grayson the truth and insisting that no one else can know that she is really Deb in Jane's body.

Deb struggles to learn more about her inherited life, learning lessons about self-esteem and personal acceptance. Eventually, the real Jane Bingum (played by Natalie Hall) reappears in another person's body after having pressed the return key, leading Deb to finally reveal the truth to Grayson, now one of Jane's closest friends. Grayson, after grieving and moving on from Deb's passing, becomes conflicted, but finally accepts Deb in her new body, saying that he wants her to be her and no one else.

In addition to working with Grayson at the law firm, Deb (as Jane) also contends with her professional rival, Kim Kaswell (Kate Levering), who briefly dates Grayson after Deb's passing.

Cast and characters

Main cast
 Brooke Elliott, as Jane Bingum (inhabited by Deb Dobkins), is a brilliant, hardworking attorney with a flair for fashion.
 Margaret Cho, as Teri Lee, is Jane's assistant.
 April Bowlby, as Stacy Barrett, is Jane's/Deb's longtime best friend and roommate, and the first human who learns that Jane is inhabited by Deb.
 Kate Levering, as Kim Kaswell, is Jane's coworker and frenemy.
 Jackson Hurst, as Grayson Kent, is Jane's closest colleague and Deb's former boyfriend, who later becomes the second human to learn about Deb inhabiting Jane's body. 
 Josh Stamberg, as Jay Parker (seasons 1–4), is Jane's former boss.
 Lex Medlin, as Owen French (seasons 4–6, recurring season 3), is Jane's ex-fiancé, later Stacy's fiancé, and father of her twins; he was a judge who later becomes a partner in the firm.
 Carter MacIntyre, as Luke Daniels (season 4, guest season 5), is Jane/Deb's second guardian angel.
 Justin Deeley, as  Paul (seasons 5–6), is Jane/Deb's third and current guardian angel, and later Grayson/Ian's guardian angel.
 Ben Feldman, as Fred (seasons 2–3, recurring seasons 1 and 4, guest season 6), is Jane/Deb's original guardian angel.

Recurring cast
 Brooke D'Orsay as the original Deb Dobkins (seasons 1–3)
 Paula Abdul as herself, as Judge Paula Abdul (seasons 1–3)
 Rosie O'Donnell as Judge Madeline Summers (seasons 1–2)
 Sharon Lawrence as Bobbi Dobkins (season 1–5)
 Faith Prince as Elaine Bingum (season 1–5)
 Jaime Ray Newman as Vanessa Hemmings (seasons 2–3 & 5)
 Marcus Lyle Brown as ADA Paul Saginaw (seasons 2–6)
 Brandy Norwood as Elisa Shayne (seasons 3–4)
 Kim Kardashian as Nikki LePree (season 4)
 Natalie Hall as Brittney (inhabited by the real Jane Bingum) (season 5)
 Annie Ilonzeh as Nicole (season 5)
 Jeffrey Pierce as Ian Holt (inhabited by Grayson) (season 6)
 Jeff Rose as Doug Resnick (seasons 2–6)
 Kwajalyn Brown as Judge Tara Flint (seasons 5–6)

Guest stars
Many well known actors and celebrities have made guest appearances on the show.  Among them are: Quinton Aaron, Melissa Ponzio, Candice Accola, Clay Aiken, Louis Van Amstel, Jake T. Austin, Diedrich Bader, Lance Bass, Amanda Bearse, Corbin Bleu, Delta Burke, Danielle Campbell, Bruce Davison, David Denman, Patty Duke, Jorja Fox, Vivica A. Fox, Robin Givens, Tony Goldwyn, Elliott Gould, Nancy Grace, Kathy Griffin, Tim Gunn, Jasmine Guy, Deidre Hall, Valerie Harper, Gregory Harrison, Natasha Henstridge, Howard Hesseman, Star Jones, Kim Kardashian, Rami Kashou, Ricki Lake, Sharon Lawrence, Mario Lopez, Chad Lowe, MacKenzie Mauzy, Abby Lee Miller, Seamus Dever, Liza Minnelli, Tyler Jacob Moore, Mark Moses, Mary Mouser, Kathy Najimy, Kelly Osbourne, Jake Pavelka, Teri Polo, Susan May Pratt, John Ratzenberger, Crystal Reed, LeAnn Rimes, Romy Rosemont, Olesya Rulin, Tony Sears, Chelsea Staub,  Cybill Shepherd,  Jamie-Lynn Sigler, James Snyder, Leelee Sobieski, Patti Stanger, Wanda Sykes, Lee Tergesen, Jennifer Tilly, Gina Torres,  Steve Valentine, Nia Vardalos, Dylan Walsh, Barry Watson, Serena Williams, Wendy Williams, Jeff Wincott, Chuck Woolery, Nick Zano, Maddie Ziegler, and the late Joan Rivers.

Development and production

Conception
Drop Dead Diva was originally developed at Fox, but ultimately Lifetime stepped in and ordered the script to pilot. According to Berman, "It's a cross between Freaky Friday and Heaven Can Wait", calling it a "life-affirming dramedy". He added that in Hollywood, "beauty has been defined as size 2 and under 25; hopefully we can help redefine the paradigm."

Filming
Though the background setting for Drop Dead Diva is set in Los Angeles, the series is filmed in Peachtree City, Georgia, and Senoia, Georgia, with principal photography taking place in a studio contained in a large hangar at Atlanta Regional Airport, and outdoor locations shot around the town. Filming originally took place in Georgia for tax incentives.

Cancellation and revival
On January 15, 2013, Lifetime announced that despite the cliffhanger at the end of season four, that would be the final season of Drop Dead Diva. Lifetime's decision to cancel the expensive drama came after the cable network approached producer Sony Pictures Television for cost-cutting options to continue with the series. Despite the cancellation, ratings for the season-four finale marked a season high, with 2.76 million viewers.  However, a month and a half after Lifetime cancelled the series, the cable network signed a deal with producer Sony Pictures TV to bring the show back for a fifth season.  The decision to bring back the series suggests that the two sides had reached a new, more cost-effective agreement.

Episodes

Reception

Critical response
Drop Dead Diva holds a score of 68 out of 100 on Metacritic, based on 12 reviews by critics for the first season. Writing for the Los Angeles Times, Mary McNamara praised Josh Berman for the series, saying: "Berman produces a deft juggling trick of heart and humor, balancing Deb's shallowness with some solid common sense and Jane's inadequate self esteem with kindness and legal brilliance." She added describing the series itself as "a lot of fun to watch". The New York Times Alessandra Stanley commented: "while the presumption that a woman can be either brainy or beautiful, or in this case, good or thin, but not both, is a bit primitive, the series has humor and charm beneath its facile message, in large part (no disrespect intended) to a subtle, winning performance by Ms. Elliott." Brian Lowry of Variety was less enthusiastic about the series, commenting: "Granted, there's much to be said for a program featuring a smart, plus-sized heroine in today's rail-thin TV world, but "Diva" under nourishes its premise amid a sea of legal-procedural banalities." He went on to state that "the epiphanies come a little too easily, and the legal triumphs predicated on knowledge of posing are a little too "Legally Blonde."" New York Daily News David Hinckley, gave the premiere two out of five stars, describing Drop Dead Diva as "still feeling like a pasted-together assortment of ideas and plot lines from productions past." However, on a more positive note he stated that "this could turn out to be the TV equivalent of a good old-fashioned summer beach read."

USA Today called Brooke Elliott "a full-blown instant star and delight who makes you wonder where she has been hiding herself." Adding: "one of the many wonderful things about Elliott's performance is that they are two people. Her transitions — like scrunching up her eyes when "Jane" is thinking, then opening them in wide, thrilled shock when "Deb" realizes that "Jane" has had a thought — are clear without seeming forced. There's pain and pleasure in the situation for both women, and Elliott makes each emotion ring true." Boston Globe also praised Elliott's performance as Jane Bingum, stating that "As Deb-inside-Jane, Elliott does a great job portraying pathos, absurd disappointment, and wide-eyed discovery."

Ratings
The show's premiere scored a 1.6 overall and more than 2.8 million viewers tuning in. Drop Dead Diva scored its highest ratings ever among women 18–49 (2.0), a 25% increase over its season-to-date average, and women 25–54 (2.3), a 28% increase over its season-to-date average.

The show aired on the Nine Network in Australia, but failed to achieve high ratings for the channel and was subsequently dropped in early September, then the following week began airing the series starting with the first episode again on Nine's digital channel GO!. In October 2011, new episodes of Drop Dead Diva moved to another of Nine's digital channels GEM, but episodes have been shown sporadically.

In the UK, the show airs on Living and premiered on April 1, 2010, at 20h to 206,000 viewers, being the seventh-most watched broadcast of the week on Living. An additional 129,000 viewers watched the premiere on Living's one-hour timeshift service.  The second series premiered on September 7 at 21h. The third season started airing in September 2011 on the revamped Sky Living. With the DVD release of the second series, in Region 2 is to be released in November over a year after its airing. After Sky Living dropped the show from their schedule, season four was made available to Netflix users in the UK and Ireland.

Awards and nominations

Home media
All six seasons were released on DVD by Sony Pictures Home Entertainment while the complete series' DVD and Blu-ray sets were released through Mill Creek Entertainment on June 4, 2019.

Soundtrack

A soundtrack for Drop Dead Diva was released on June 1, 2010, by Madison Gate Records. It is titled Drop Dead Diva (Music from the Original Television Series). The track list includes music by Brooke Elliott, Margaret Cho, Ben Feldman, Scott Starrett, Confetti, Becca Jones, Platinum Pied Pipers, Lil' Wendy, Madi Diaz, Dri, Katie Herzig, Malbec and Joshua Morrison.

Remakes
In 2017, South Korean TV network MBC announced that it will broadcast a local remake of the series, titled Goddess of the Court. Jointly produced by Sony Pictures Television and local production company Redwoods (the company behind the hit 2015–2016 TV series Six Flying Dragons), it is planned for broadcast on the network's Wednesday–Thursday primetime slot in early 2018. SPT also plans to broadcast the series on its owned-and-operated channels across 160 countries, including Sony One.

Drop Dead Dave 
In September 2021, it was reported that a reboot of the series titled Drop Dead Dave was in development at CBS. It was to be produced by Osprey Production and Sony Pictures Television, with Berman returning as writer and executive producer and Jamie Babbit as director. The new series would have incorporated a gender-swap premise, with the main character, Dave, having his soul transferred into a lawyer named Rita following a freak accident. CBS however opted to not pick up the series.

See also
 Body swap appearances in media

References

External links
 
 

 
2009 American television series debuts
2014 American television series endings
2000s American comedy-drama television series
2010s American comedy-drama television series
2000s American romantic comedy television series
2010s American romantic comedy television series
2000s American legal television series
2010s American legal television series
Angels in television
English-language television shows
Fiction about body swapping
American fantasy television series
Lifetime (TV network) original programming
American television series revived after cancellation
Television series by Sony Pictures Television
Television shows set in Los Angeles
Television shows filmed in Atlanta
Television shows filmed in Georgia (U.S. state)
American legal drama television series
Television shows remade overseas
Non-American television series based on American television series